Xenophysogobio is a genus of cyprinid fish endemic to China. There are currently two described species in this genus.

Species
 Xenophysogobio boulengeri (T. L. Tchang, 1929)
 Xenophysogobio nudicorpa (H. J. Huang & W. Zhang, 1986)

References

External links
 

 
Cyprinid fish of Asia
Freshwater fish of China
Cyprinidae genera